Aksha Pardasany is an Indian actress. She has acted in Telugu, Malayalam films such as Yuvatha, Goal, Ride and Kandireega.

Personal life 
Aksha hails from a Sindhi background. She attended the Bombay Scottish School, Mahim, where she completed her 12th standard.

Career 
During her 8th class year she began modeling and has since acted in approximately 75 commercials. She made her debut in the Malayalam film Goal, where the director Yuvatha spotted her and signed her for one of the lead roles in his films. She finished working on Goal while she was in the 10th class. She appeared as a guest in a song for a Malayalam film titled Bangles.

After a span of two years, she appeared in the Telugu film Bengal Tiger in a cameo role.

Aksha got into collaboration with a US-based fashion brand Yog The Label. They sell her photos featuring products manufactured in USA and Europe worldwide.

Filmography

As actress

Web series

References

External links
 

Living people
Actresses in Hindi cinema
Actresses in Malayalam cinema
Actresses in Telugu cinema
1991 births
Actresses in Tamil cinema
21st-century Indian actresses
Indian film actresses